Beetzsee is a municipality in the Potsdam-Mittelmark district, in Brandenburg, Germany. It takes its name from the Beetzsee, a large lake.

Demography

References

Localities in Potsdam-Mittelmark